The Yijin Jing is a manual containing a series of exercises, coordinated with breathing, intended to dramatically enhance physical health when practiced consistently. In Chinese yi means "change", jin means "tendons and sinews", while jing means "methods". 

While some consider these exercises as a form of Qigong, yijin jing is a relatively intense practice that aims to strengthen muscles and tendons, promote strength and flexibility, increase speed and stamina, and improve balance and coordination of the body. These exercises are notable for their incorporation as key elements of the physical conditioning used in Shaolin training.

In the modern day, many translations and distinct sets of exercises are derived from the original (the provenance of which is the subject of some debate).

See also
Baduanjin
Liu Zi Jue
Qigong

Notes

References

 
 
 
 

Qigong
Chinese martial arts
Warrior code
Shaolin Temple